Karaganda Region, also spelled Qaraghandy Region, is a region of Kazakhstan. Its capital is Karaganda.

On 17 March 2022 it was announced that Karaganda would be divided, with the formation of the Ulytau Region. This officially came into force on 8 June 2022.

History
The region was the site of intense coal mining during the days of the Soviet Union and also the site of several Gulag forced labor camps. Following World War II, Joseph Stalin, leader of the Soviet Union, had many ethnic Germans deported to the area.

There have been constant border changes within the region's history. The first took place in 1954 when it was ceded parts of Kustanay Oblast and parts of Taldy-Kurgan Oblast. In 1973, Dzhezkazgan Oblast was split off from Karaganda Oblast making it a fraction of the size it once was. In 1986, Karaganda Oblast was given the southern part of Tselinograd Oblast as part of another set of border reforms taking place in the Kazakh S.S.R. When Kazakhstan gained independence in 1991, Karaganda Oblast retained its post-1988 boundaries. The last change the region saw was in 1998 when Jezkazgan (Dzhezkazgan) Oblast was liquidated and re-merged with Karaganda oblast, thus making it the largest region of Kazakhstan in terms of area once again.

Archaeological findings 
In July 2019, remains of a young couple buried face to face dated 4,000 years back were unearthed in Karaganda Region in central Kazakhstan by a group of archaeologists led by Igor Kukushkin from Saryarka Archaeological Institute in Karaganda. It is assumed that the Bronze Age couple were 16 or 17 years old when they died. Kukushkin supposes that they were from a 'noble family' thanks to the buried gold and jewelry artifacts, ceramic pots, woman's two bracelets on each arm beads, remains of horses and knives found in the grave.

Geography
With an area of 428,000 km2, Karaganda Region is Kazakhstan's largest region. It is known for its natural environment and historical sights. Although it doesn't touch the borders of any country, it touches nearly every other region, due to its location in the center of the country. They are: Aktobe Region to the west; Kostanay Region to the northwest; Akmola Region to the north; Pavlodar Region to the northeast; East Kazakhstan Region to the east; Almaty Region to the southeast; Jambyl Region and Turkistan Region to the south; and Kyzylorda Region to the southwest.

The area is arid with flat plains between hills and seasonal streams.

The Ishim (Esil) River, a tributary of the Irtysh River, begins in Karaganda Region; the Nura River and Tokrau are the region's other major rivers. The Ishim and Nura are replenished with water from the Irtysh, supplied by the 451 km long Irtysh–Karaganda Canal.
Lake Balkhash is located on the Southeast side.

Demographics

As of 2020, the Karaganda Region has a population of 1,376,882.

Ethnic groups (2020):
Kazakh: 52.36%
Russian: 35.07%
Ukrainian: 2.84%
German: 2.28%
Tatar: 2.21%
Others: 5.24%

Administrative divisions
The region is administratively divided into nine districts and the cities and towns of oblast significance of Karaganda, Balkhash, Jezkazgan, Karazhal, Saran, Shakhtinsk, and Temirtau. The districts are: 
 Abay District, with the administrative center in the town of Abay;
 Aktogay District, the selo of Aktogay;
 Bukhar-Zhyrau District, the settlement of Botakara;
 Karkaraly District, the town of Karkaraly;
 Nura District, the settlement of Kiyevka;
 Osakarov District, the settlement of Osakarovka;
 Shet District, the selo of Aksu-Ayuly;
 Ulytau District, the selo of Ulytau;
 Zhanaarka District, the settlement of Atasu.

The following nine localities in Karaganda Region have town status: Karaganda, Balkhash, Jezkazgan, Karazhal, Priozersk, Saran, Satbayev, Shakhtinsk, and Temirtau.

For some decades during the USSR era, the southern part of what is today Karaganda Region was a separate region, known as Jezkazgan Region, with the administrative center in Jezkazgan.

Elections

Sister cities
  Ulsan, South Korea (2010)

External links
 Regional administration website
 Karaganda Region Chamber of Commerce and Industry
 Karaganda Region Customs

References

 
Regions of Kazakhstan